Bobby Berk is an Emmy winning television host, author and interior designer. He stars in the Netflix series Queer Eye as the interior design expert.

Early life
Berk was born in Houston, Texas to a young mother and then adopted by his maternal aunt and her husband, Connie and Jerry Berk. He grew up in Mount Vernon, Missouri in the middle of Amish farm country. Berk cites that being gay in the Bible Belt and attending an Assemblies of God church throughout his childhood was difficult, and that he faced both internal and external homophobia growing up.

Berk left home at the age of fifteen. He landed in Springfield, Missouri and got a job at Applebee's, in Branson, sleeping in his car or staying with friends. He drove home for school as a sophomore and attended Kickapoo High School for junior year. He then worked as a telemarketer for MCI Communications. It was through this job that he first met his biological father. Just before he turned eighteen, he moved to Denver, Colorado, where he got a gig at the Bombay Company.

Career
Berk relocated to New York City in 2003. He found employment at Restoration Hardware and Bed, Bath and Beyond before moving on to Portico, a high-end home furnishing company. With no high school diploma or formal training he worked his way up to creative director.

After Portico folded in 2006, Berk launched his online store, Bobby Berk Home, in 2006, opening his first store in SoHo, Manhattan a year later. Midtown Miami, Florida followed in 2010 as well as Midtown Atlanta, Georgia. He later launched Bobby Berk Interiors + Design, specializing in interior design services, whose headquarters is in Downtown Los Angeles. He has appeared on television networks such as HGTV, NBC, CBS, and Bravo.

He has been the design expert on the Netflix series Queer Eye since 2018. Berk appeared in Taylor Swift's "You Need to Calm Down" music video.

Berk has his own line of wallpaper, furniture, and art, and runs an interior design business.

In 2021, Berk competed in season six of The Masked Singer as the wild card contestant "Caterpillar". He was eliminated alongside Willie Robertson as "Mallard" in Group B semi-final's episode.

In 2022, Bobby received an honorary degree of Doctor of Fine Arts from Otis College of Art and Design

Personal life 
In July 2018, Berk and his husband, Dewey Do, a maxillofacial surgeon, moved to Los Angeles, California after living in New York City for 15 years.

Berk endorsed Elizabeth Warren in the 2020 Democratic Party presidential primaries.

On June 23, 2020, Berk and Queer Eye co-star Jonathan Van Ness praised recent U.S. Supreme Court decisions which ruled that LGBT employment discrimination was a violation of the Civil Rights Act of 1964. However, both of them still urged the United States Congress to pass the proposed Equality Act, which Berk claimed would amend the Civil Rights Act so it "would really extend healthcare and housing rights."

Filmography

Music videos

References

External links 
 
 

Living people
20th-century American artists
21st-century American artists
American adoptees
American interior designers
American television personalities
Male television personalities
American gay artists
Gay entertainers
Interior design firms
American LGBT entertainers
LGBT people from Missouri
LGBT people from Texas
Artists from Houston
People from Mount Vernon, Missouri
Product designers
21st-century American LGBT people
Year of birth missing (living people)